Ashley Stewart is an American plus size women's clothing company and lifestyle brand, which was founded in 1991. The name Ashley Stewart was inspired by Laura Ashley and Martha Stewart, who the company saw as icons of upscale Americana.

The Secaucus, New Jersey-based company has 89 stores across 22 states. They sell a variety of apparel, ranging from jeans to dresses and shoes. In recent years the brand has made a comeback, after filing for bankruptcy in 2010 and 2014.

History

Ashley Stewart arose out of real estate investor Joseph Sitt's frustration in bringing retailers into the inner city New York neighborhoods where he was developing real estate projects. After hiring merchants to study the market, he found that the biggest gap was in upscale fashion for plus-sized urban career women, and decided to open retail stores himself.

Ashley Stewart was founded in 1991, and quickly grew to over 380 stores in more than 100 cities, recording annual sales as high as US $400 million, which prompted many national retailers to follow suit, and helped change the urban retail landscape. In 1996 the TSG Capital Fund II made an initial investment of US$30 million in Ashley Stewart.

The company focused on holding events like fashion shows instead of launching large advertising campaigns. They would often hold 300 to 350 fashion shows a year, which raised money for the communities they were in. Each Ashley Stewart store also hired from within the community, and the company was recognized by President Bill Clinton for its contribution to the Welfare-to-work program.

Reinvention
In 2000 Sitt sold the company, after which it was owned by multiple private equity firms - a group led by Trimaran Fund II bought the company in 2004, and in 2010 they were purchased by GB Merchant Partners. The company faced financial difficulties during this time period, and would eventually file for bankruptcy in 2010 and again in 2014. After the 2014 bankruptcy the company was owned by affiliates of Clearlake Capital and the FirePine Group. Despite their financial troubles, the company re-introduced a charitable giving program during the 2013 holiday season.

In the face of the company's severe liquidity shortage, James Rhee, a member of the Ashley Stewart's board of directors, resigned from his position and assumed full-time operational leadership of Ashley Stewart as the company faced imminent liquidation. Rhee moved the headquarters into a smaller space without enclosed offices, putting an emphasis on developing a more egalitarian, friendly, open and collaborative corporate culture. He also went to the stores and talked to customers, while writing a new business plan for the company. Approximately 100 stores were closed during this time, while the production cycle was sped up, as to get fresh clothing into stores in four to six weeks. Rhee also put an emphasis on expanding online, increasing their use of email and SMS, and expanding their presence on social media.

After Rhee became CEO the company's fortunes improved drastically, going from taking average losses of US$5–6 million a year (reaching a high of US$12 million annually) to bringing in profits of US $20 annually as of 2016. The company also eliminated its debt during this time. Inc. Magazine described the turnaround as one of the fashion industry's most impressive in the past few years, and preventing bankruptcy saved the jobs of the approximately 1000 people who now work for Ashley Stewart.

Rhee was recognized by the National Retail Federation's Foundation as a 2016 Power Player for his work in turning the company around and developing a core strategy based on kindness and loyalty. He was also awarded the Ernst & Young Entrepreneur Of The Year award in 2016 for his work with Ashley Stewart. Rhee has said that he seeks to manage the company 'like a hedge fund', with the level of mathematical analysis and operational discipline of a blue chip investment firm, while at the same time developing a kind, open, and egalitarian corporate culture.

The company has also successfully moved into e-commerce, with e-commerce business accounting for approximately 40% of revenue as of 2016. They have also expanded internationally, and are now shipping to Canada, the Caribbean, and the UK. They opened their first new store since the bankruptcy in Newark, New Jersey, in April 2017.

References

External links
 Official Website

American companies established in 1991
Companies that filed for Chapter 11 bankruptcy in 2010
Companies that filed for Chapter 11 bankruptcy in 2014